The Nicolae Iorga Prize is offered by the Romanian Academy for the best work published in a year in the fields of History and Archaeology. It is named in honor of Romanian historian and politician Nicolae Iorga. Like all prizes of the Romanian Academy, the Nicolae Iorga Prize for a particular year is awarded two years after the publication of the winning work.

References

Prizes of the Romanian Academy